Sang-e Sefid (also Romanized as Sang-e Sefīd, Sang-i-Sefīd, and Sang Sefid) is a village in Qasabeh-ye Sharqi Rural District, in the Central District of Sabzevar County, Razavi Khorasan Province, Iran. At the 2006 census, its population was 390, in 129 families.

References 

Populated places in Sabzevar County